Ashab-ul-Haq was an Awami League politician and the former Member of Parliament of Kushtia-7.

Career
Ashab-ul-Haq was elected to parliament from Kushtia-7 as an Awami League candidate in 1973.

Death
Ashab-ul-Haq died on 7 October 2010.

References

Awami League politicians
1921 births
2010 deaths
1st Jatiya Sangsad members